Mary Musani (born 4 September 1944) is a Ugandan hurdler. She competed in the women's 80 metres hurdles at the 1964 Summer Olympics.

References

1944 births
Living people
Athletes (track and field) at the 1964 Summer Olympics
Ugandan female hurdlers
Olympic athletes of Uganda
Place of birth missing (living people)